Matthew Jordan Ireland, Professionally known as Jordie Ireland is an Australian based Record producer, best known for his single "Take Cover". Ireland names his musical influences as Avicii, Martin Garrix, Flume and Zedd.

Career

Early life
Born in 1997, Jordie Ireland grew up with a love of musical instruments. By the age of 11 Ireland was classically trained in both piano and guitar as well as drums and violin. At age of 14, Ireland saw Avicii, perform at an under-18s festival and knew straight away that’s what he wanted to do.

2017-present 
In 2017, Ireland signed with Casablanca Records and in October, released his debut single "Take Cover". The song was certified Gold in Australia in 2018. In May 2018, Ireland released "One in a Million" featuring Ava Hayz.

In November 2022, Ireland released his debut EP Stages of a Heartbreak.

Discography

Extended plays

Singles

References

External links
 

1997 births
21st-century Australian musicians
Australian electronic musicians
Australian house musicians
Living people
Musicians from Sydney
21st-century Australian male musicians